The Adolescents is a 1968 Mexican drama film directed by Abel Salazar. The film was selected as the Mexican entry for the Best Foreign Language Film at the 40th Academy Awards, but was not accepted as a nominee.

Cast
 Luis Aragón as Rafael
 Sandra Boyd
 Ismael Camacho
 Elizabeth Dupeyrón
 Carlos Fernandez as Raúl
 Lucy Gallardo as Lala
 Julissa as María
 Claudia Martell
 Carmen Montejo as Lucía
 Alfonso Munguía
 Carlos Navarro as Mauricio
 Julián Pastor as Ramón
 Carlos Piñar as Juan
 Renata Seydel as Kikis

See also
 List of submissions to the 40th Academy Awards for Best Foreign Language Film
 List of Mexican submissions for the Academy Award for Best Foreign Language Film

References

External links
 

1968 films
1960s Spanish-language films
1968 drama films
Films directed by Abel Salazar
Mexican drama films
1960s Mexican films